Harold Blevins (born October 19, 1943) is an American former professional basketball player and coach. He was a four-year starter for the Arkansas AM&N Golden Lions, where he is considered one of the program's greatest scorers. Blevins was a three-time National Association of Intercollegiate Athletics (NAIA) All-American and four-time All-Southwestern Athletic Conference (SWAC) selection.

Blevins was selected by the New York Knicks in the 1965 NBA draft as the 14th overall pick and became the first Golden Lions player to be selected in an National Basketball Association (NBA) draft. Despite not playing football in college, he signed as a free agent with the Dallas Cowboys of the National Football League (NFL) that same year. Blevins ultimately played in neither the NBA nor the NFL but played for the Trenton Colonials of the Eastern Professional Basketball League (EPBL) during the 1965–66 season. He was drafted into the United States Army in 1966 and served a two-year stint in Vietnam.

Upon returning from Vietnam, Blevins became the head basketball coach for two junior colleges, including the men's and women's teams at Harford Community College. In 1995, he became the head coach of the Golden Lions men's basketball team. Blevins had a 36–147 record over seven seasons and was fired on July 16, 2002.

Blevins was inducted into the Arkansas–Pine Bluff Golden Lions Hall of Fame in 2004 and the SWAC Hall of Fame in 2005. His No. 50 jersey was retired by the Golden Lions in 2016.

Notes

References

1943 births
Living people
African-American basketball coaches
African-American basketball players
American men's basketball coaches
American men's basketball players
Arkansas–Pine Bluff Golden Lions men's basketball coaches
Arkansas–Pine Bluff Golden Lions men's basketball players
Basketball coaches from Alabama
Basketball players from Alabama
College men's basketball head coaches in the United States
Junior college men's basketball coaches in the United States
Junior college women's basketball coaches in the United States
New York Knicks draft picks
Shooting guards
Sportspeople from Tuscaloosa, Alabama
Trenton Colonials players
21st-century African-American people
20th-century African-American sportspeople